Let's Do It is a studio album by American musician Roy Ayers. It was released in 1978 through Polydor Records. Recording sessions for the album took place at Sigma Sound Studios and Electric Lady Studios in New York City, and at Record Plant in Los Angeles. Production was handled by Ayers himself with co-production by William Allen. The album features contributions from Merry Clayton, Sylvia Cox and Debbie Burrell on vocals, Harry Whitaker, Armen Donelian and Philip Woo on piano, Greg Moore on guitar, Kerry Turman on bass, Bernard Purdie on drums, Chano O'Ferral on congas, Justo Almario on saxophone, and John Mosley on trumpet.

The album peaked at number 33 on the Billboard 200 albums chart and at number 15 on the Top R&B/Hip-Hop Albums chart in the United States. It spawned two 7-inch singles: "Freaky Deaky" and "Let's Do It". "Freake Deaky" reached peak position #29 on the Hot R&B/Hip-Hop Songs chart.

Track listing

Personnel 
 Roy Ayers – lead vocals, arrangement (tracks: 1, 3-7), producer
 Merry Clayton – lead vocals (tracks: 5, 6), backing vocals
 Sylvia Cox – lead vocals (tracks: 5, 6), backing vocals
 Debbie Burrell – backing vocals
 William Henry Allen – bass, arrangement, co-producer
 Harry Lamah Whitaker – piano
 Armen Donelian – piano
 Philip Woo – piano
 Gregory David Moore – guitar
 Kerry Turman – bass
 Bernard Lee "Pretty" Purdie – drums
 Chano O'Ferral – congas
 Justo Almario – tenor saxophone
 John Clifford Mosley, Jr. – trumpet
Technical
 Michael Hutchinson – engineering & mixing
 Bruce Hensal – engineering
 Jerry Solomon – engineering
 J.D. Stewart – assistant engineering

Chart history

References

External links 

1978 albums
Roy Ayers albums
Polydor Records albums
Albums produced by Roy Ayers